The Bon Homme County Courthouse is a historic three-story building in Tyndall, South Dakota, and the courthouse of Bon Homme County, South Dakota. It was designed in the Beaux-Arts style by architect A. Schartz, and built with granite by the A. M. Wold Company in 1914. Inside, there are murals painted by A.E. Soderberg, an immigrant from Sweden who worked for Oyen Studios. The building has been listed on the National Register of Historic Places since December 13, 1984.

References

Beaux-Arts architecture in South Dakotaj
National Register of Historic Places in Bon Homme County, South Dakota
Government buildings completed in 1914
1914 establishments in South Dakota